Black as Death is the fourth studio album by Belgian power metal band Iron Mask, released on December 16, 2011 by AFM Records. All songs were composed by Dushan Petrossi. The album marks another change in band-lineup, comprising ex-Yngwie Malmsteen bandmates Mark Boals, Göran Edman, and Mats Olausson.

Track listing
 "From Light into the Dark" – 1:41
 "Black as Death" – 6:59
 "Broken Hero" – 3:18
 "Feel the Fire" – 4:34
 "Genghis Khan" – 5:53
 "God Punishes, I Kill" – 7:40
 "Rebel Kid" – 5:02
 "Blizzard of Doom" – 5:20
 "The Absence" – 4:08
 "Magic Sky Requiem" – 5:40
 "Nosferatu" – 6:27
 "When All Braves Fall" – 5:41
 "Sons of The Sun" (Japan Bonus Track) - 4:31
 "Evil Strikes in Silence" (Europe Bonus Track) – 4:47
 "March of The Slaves" (vinyl bonus track)

Personnel 
Dushan Petrossi - all guitars, orchestral samples
Mark Boals - lead vocals, bass-guitar
Vassili Moltchanov - bass
Mats Olausson - keyboards
Ramy Ali - drums
Roma Siadletski - harsh vocals
Goetz "Valhalla Jr." Mohr - guest vocals on 13, 14
Göran Edman - guest vocals on 10
Oliver Hartmann - backing vocals and choirs

Technical personnel 
Mix & mastering, drum recording - Dennis Ward at House of Audio, Germany
Guitars, bass, orchestral samples recording - Dushan Petrossi at Iron Kingdom Studio, Belgium
Vocals recording - Mark Boals, USA
Keyboards recording - Mats Olausson, Sweden
Artwork - Genzoman
Frontcover concept - Dushan Petrossi
Design and layout - Thomas Ewerhard

References

Iron Mask (band) albums
2011 albums